Gabriel Nicolás Seijas (born 24 March 1994) is an Argentine professional footballer who plays as a midfielder for Talleres Remedios.

Career
Estudiantes were the first senior team of Seijas' career. He made his professional bow in the Primera División in September 2014, appearing for seventy-two minutes of a one-goal defeat away to Atlético de Rafaela under manager Mauricio Pellegrino. Five appearances followed across the 2015 campaign, though he didn't feature in the subsequent 2016. On 3 July 2016, Primera B Metropolitana side Atlanta signed Seijas. He netted his first goal in the penultimate month of his opening season, scoring the third of the club's four goals at the Estadio Fragata Presidente Sarmiento versus Almirante Brown in May 2017; they came third in 2016–17.

Career statistics
.

References

External links

1994 births
Living people
People from Berazategui Partido
Argentine footballers
Association football midfielders
Argentine Primera División players
Primera B Metropolitana players
Estudiantes de La Plata footballers
Club Atlético Atlanta footballers
Talleres de Remedios de Escalada footballers
Sportspeople from Buenos Aires Province